Microcalamus is a genus of African plants in the grass family. The only known species is Microcalamus barbinodis, native to central Africa (Cameroon, Gabon, Republic of Congo, Central African Republic).

References

Panicoideae
Flora of Africa
Monotypic Poaceae genera